Rots or ROTS may refer to:
 Rots, Calvados, a commune in Basse-Normandie, France
 Daan Rots (born 2001), Dutch professional footballer
 Esther Rots (born 1972), Dutch film director
 Renewed Order of the Solar Temple
 Star Wars: Episode III – Revenge of the Sith, a 2005 American epic space opera film

See also
 Rot (disambiguation)
 Revenge of the Screen Savers, abbreviated ROTSS